Jatindranath Sengupta (or Yatīndranātha Senagupta) (June 26, 1887 in Patilpara, Purba Bardhaman – September 17, 1954) was an Indian Bengali-language poet and writer.

Birth
Jatindranath Sengupta was born on 26 June in the year of 1887 at Patilpara in Purba Bardhaman district, West Bengal at his maternal uncle's house. His ancestral village was Haripur, a village situated near Shantipur in Nadia district, West Bengal.

Education and early life
Born  to Dwarkanath Sengupta and Mohitkumari Devi, Jatindranath had his early education  in his home village Haripur, about three miles away from Shantipur a seat of Vaishnav culture in the district of Nadia. Coming over to Kolkata he stayed with his Kaviraj uncle and passed the Entrance examination in 1903, the First Arts examination in 1905 ( from the General Assembly's Institution, now Scottish Church College) and then graduated as a civil engineer from the Bengal Engineering College(now IIEST) at Shibpore, which was then affiliated with the University of Calcutta. In 1908 he was married to Jyotirlata Devi, the second daughter of Charuchandra Gupta, a practising lawyer in Hazaribagh (Jharkhand state). It was a rather poor family that the poet belonged to and his father Dwarkanath spent most of his active life as the Headmaster of a school at Patishar ( now in Bangladesh) owned by the Tagore estate.

Service life 
For a few years he worked as the acting District Engineer of Nadia. He then had a bout of illness that left him jobless for nearly three years. An ardent believer in Gandhism he tried to make  both ends meet by spinning yarns in Charkha and by producing home made match boxes  with the help of unemployed village boys . It is needless to say that nothing worked. In 1923 he took up the job of the Estate Engineer in the  Cossimbazar Raj Estate . He remained in the same post till his retirement  in 1950.

Literary characteristics 
Jatindranath made his mark in Bengali literary scene  in the twenties as a poet of rugged  masculinity with a diction all of his own. His first three books Marichika (Mirage ), Marushikha  ( the desert flame ) and Marumaya (the desert illusion) established his fame as a poet of a new genre who rejected romanticism  and any sublime imagination  beyond the perception of senses.  He thus tried to break away from the all pervasive  influence of Tagore in Bengali poetry. His barbed comments on the romantic poets of the time and remarks on God, almost always satirical and sometimes irreverent  earned him the label of an atheist  and a pessimist.  Scholars generally agree that the trio of Jatindranath Sengupta, Mohitlal Majumdar  and Kazi Nazrul Islam  heralded modernism in Bengali poetry.  Both in form and content  whether in  his remarkably seamless juxtaposition of rustic expressions alongside  richly Sankritized words or in metrical forms or in his perceived atheism, he left a strong influence on the immediate group of distinguished modern poets. From Sayam (dusk) onwards, his poems took a perceptible turn towards beauty, love and a pining for the youth, he once ridiculed. It also became clear that he was not really an atheist but his tirade against God  was in reality a mental attitude, perhaps reflecting  a   love-hate relationship  with a personal God whose benign face he wanted to see but could not. He wrote extensively on the poorer section of the society . These poems, in spite of the allegorical content, represent a broad humanism which unsurprisingly had seeds of feminism as well.

Literary works

Verses 
 Marichika (1923)
 Marushikha (1927)
 Marumaya (1930)
 Sayam (1941)
 Trijama (1948)
 Nishantika (1957, published posthumously)

Selected Verses 
 Anupurba (1946, 1954)
 Kavita Sankalan (ed. Sunil Kanti Sen, 1981)

Complete Poetical Works 
 Kavya Sambhar (1966)
 Kavya Sangraha (ed. Sunil Kanti Sen, 2000)

Translations 
 Kumarasamvaba    (1942  the Kalidas epic)
 Gandhi Bani Kanika (1948,  in verse form from a selection of Gandhiji's sayings)
 Rathi O Sarathi  (1951, Gita for young minds)
 Shakespeare O Anyanya Anubad  (2003, Macbeth, Hamlet and Othello in full and Anthony and Cleopatra in part, Rime of the Ancient Mariner)

References

External links

Jatindranath Sengupta at the West Bengal Public Library Network

1887 births
1954 deaths
Bengali male poets
Bengali-language poets
Bengali writers
Bengali-language writers
Oriental Seminary alumni
Scottish Church College alumni
University of Calcutta alumni
Bengali Hindus
20th-century Indian poets
20th-century Indian male writers
Writers from West Bengal